Since 2001, the Innsbruck School of Peace Studies has been developed by Wolfgang Dietrich and his team at the University of Innsbruck. Austria. In 2008 the UNESCO Chair for Peace Studies has been established. In 2017 the team of rectors founded the Unit for Peace and Conflict Studies at the Faculty for Social and Political Sciences and transferred it to the Faculty for Humanities in 2019. Finally, in 2018 the Research Center for Peace and Conflict INNPEACE was founded as a transdisciplinary research initiative of academics from nine very different institutes. Together they form the so called Innsbruck School of Peace Studies.

Research and Publications 
The Innsbruck School of Peace Studies became famous for its unique approach with the key phrase “transrational peaces” and with its specific and tough training method in the sense of John Paul Lederach's elicitive conflict transformation. Both principles are applied in practice and developed further in the frame of the MA Program for Peace Studies. The UNESCO Chair promotes further research in these fields and the publication of the respective results, in the following book series:

 Many Peaces Trilogy (Palgrave) by Wolfgang Dietrich: 
Vol 1: Interpretations of Peace in History and Culture (2011, German original 2008)
Vol 2: Elicitive Conflict Transformation and the Transrational Shift in Peace Politics (2012, German original 2011)
Vol 3: Elicitive Conflict Mapping (2018; German original 2015).
An epilogue to the trilogy has been published 2021 in German as a separate book under the title: Der die das Frieden. Nachbemerkungen zur Trilogie über die vielen Frieden (Springer VS, Wiesbaden)

 Elicitiva (Springer): Discussing specific aspects of humanistic psychology for peace research and applied conflict work.
 Masters of Peace (LIT; Springer; University of Innsbruck Press): Outstanding MA theses of Innsbruck's students.

Furthermore, a series of edited volumes has emerged in the framework of the Innsbruck School:
 Key Texts of Peace Studies (LIT)
 The Palgrave International Handbook of Peace Studies: A Cultural Perspective (Palgrave)
 Transrational Resonances (Palgrave)

Norbert Koppensteiner, a Dietrich-student and former program coordinator at the MA Program in Peace, Development, Security and International Conflict Transformation, is another important representative of the Innsbruck School of Peace Studies. In his book The Art of the Transpersonal Self he draws on findings of humanistic and transpersonal psychology. His work can be seen as a critique of some of Modernity's founding principles like truth. Koppensteiner argues that the autonomous and self grounded subject, morals or solvability of conflicts have become sites of contestation and debate. He suggests to re-think some of those categories being debated in (post)modernity by invoking transpersonal and transrational transpositions. Asking about the continued possibilities for subjectivation, Koppensteiner sketches the outlines of an art of living for a subjectivity perceived as constantly emergent and in transformation, a subjectivity that dares to embrace conflict as part of its transpersonal relational becoming and that emerges through an ongoing transformation of the self understood as an aesthetic (Apollonian) and energetic (Dionysian) practice. The strictly relational understanding of peaces and conflict that Koppensteiner proposes is one of the central ontological assumptions of the Innsbruck School of Peace Studies. This has been further elaborated by Koppensteiner in his recent book Transrational Peace Research and Elicitive Facilitation. The Self as (Re)Source, Palgrave Macmillan, 2020.

Other important representatives of the Innsbruck School of Peace Studies are Josefina Echavarría, the former Research and Publications Coordinator who moved to the Kroc Institute for International Peace Studies, Daniela Ingruber, Jennifer Murphy, Andreas Oberprantacher, Noah Taylor, Paula Ditzel Facci, Shawn Bryant and Catalina Vallejo. Each academic year leading international scholars of Peace and Conflict Studies visit the MA Program at the University of Innsbruck.

Transrational Peace Philosophy 
The Innsbruck School of Peace Studies is based on Wolfgang Dietrich's transrational approach to Peace Studies and is outlined in his Many Peaces Trilogy. Spanning continents as well as disciplines, Dietrich presents a panorama of diverse interpretations of peace in world history and culture. In a journey through time and space, Dietrich outlines the so-called five families of peace - energetic, moral, modern, post-modern and trans-rational. He stresses the importance of combining rationality and reason with human properties such as emotion and spirituality in applied peace work. This ontological assumption indicates a paradigm shift and proposes a new epistemological understanding of peace, which is at the heart of the Innsbruck School's peace philosophy.

Elicitive Conflict Transformation 
Elicitive Conflict Transformation was first introduced to the field by John Paul Lederach in 1995 and is the applied method of transrational peace philosophy. Drawing on the debate on multi-track diplomacy, Lederach initially distinguished between three levels of conflict: 
 Top Leaders
 Middle-Range Leaders
 Grassroots

Wolfgang Dietrich draws on Lederach's systemic approach to conflict and developed a multi-layered model of conflict analysis. Furthermore, he systematizes elective conflict transformation techniques in three main groups: 
 Voice Oriented Approaches to Conflict Transformation; e.g. non-violent communication after Marshall Rosenberg and Theme-Centered Interaction after Ruth Cohn.
 Body-oriented approaches to conflict transformation; e.g. Theatre for Living after David Diamond, Butho- and Five Rhythms Dance, after Gabrielle Roth
 breath oriented approaches to conflict transformation; e.g. Holotropic Breathwork after Stanislav Grof and Sylvester Walch.

All three types of approaches to conflict share a strong reference to systems theory and hence a strictly relational understanding of conflicts.

Elicitive Conflict Mapping 
Elicitive Conflict Mapping is a brand-new tool that has been developed at the Innsbruck School of Peace Studies based on the well known principles of Humanistic Psychology proposed by Abraham Maslow, Carl Rogers, Virginia Satir or Frederick Perls. By bringing together the theoretical and academic building blocks of the Innsbruck School of Peace Studies in a didactical format, with special emphasis on the graphic components, ECM aims to support those in search of:
 Understanding and clarifying the conflict episode
 Visibilizing the conflict parties
 Viewing the conflict dynamics at different levels and through different layers.

Unit for Peace and Conflict Studies 
In January 2017 the Unit for Peace and Conflict Studies was inaugurated. It consists of the UNESCO Chair for Peace Studies, which is the rooftop for a large number of research and cooperation projects and the MA Program in Peace, Development, Security and International Conflict Transformation. Also the 2018 founded Research Center for Peace and Conflict INNPEACE is coordinated from here. Since the retirement of Wolfgang Dietrich in 2021, Rina Alluri is the new Head of the Unit.

UNESCO Chair for Peace Studies 
The UNESCO Chair for Peace Studies of the University of Innsbruck was established in June 2008 as a consequence of the systematic research on the interpretations of peaces and the unique approach to peace studies as developed by Innsbruck's MA program for Peace Studies since 2001. The agreement has been signed between the UNESCO, represented by its Director-General Koichiro Matsuura, and the University of Innsbruck, represented by its rector Karlheinz Töchterle. Since 2008 Wolfgang Dietrich is the UNESCO Chairholder for Pace Studies in Innsbruck.

In the light of the excellent results achieved and confirmed by the positive evaluation of the report on its activities, UNESCO renewed in February 2015 and June 2019 the 2008 agreement concerning the UNESCO Chair for Peace Studies at the University of Innsbruck until June 2023.

According to the agreement the main purposes of the UNESCO Chair are:
 the promotion of an integrated system of research, training, information and documentation in the field of peace studies;
 the facilitation of collaboration between high-level, internationally recognized researchers and teaching staff of the University and other institutions in Austria, in Europe and North America, and other regions of the world;
 the reinforcement of the existing network of cooperating partners through further regional, as well as international, cooperation;
 the enhancement and complement of the already existing on-line teaching methods;
 the exchange of professors, researchers, and students with other universities within the framework of UNITWIN/UNESCO Chairs Programme.

The MA Program in Peace, Development, Security and International Conflict Studies 
Founded in 2001, the MA Program in Peace, Development, Security and International Conflict Transformation has become a leading Masters Program, training the next generation of Peace and Conflict Studies scholars and Conflict Workers. In its didactical approach the program follows a relational approach to conflict of elective conflict transformation, which is conveyed to the students in theory and practice. After the successful completion of an MA thesis students are awarded the academic title Master of Arts (120 ECTS Credit Points).

By October 2021, the Innsbruck Peace Studies program appeared in the critical public debate, first of all in the Austrian Broadcasting Company (ORF) and in the Tiroler Tageszeitung, resulting in a press conference, given by the central university administration, in which they declared, that the peace studies, nevertheless it was called MA Programm, was not an official MA Programm of the Innsbruck University, but only a extracurricular Course for Peace, Development, Security and International Conflict Transformation [außerordentlicher Lehrgang für Frieden, Entwicklung, Sicherheit und internationale Konflikttransformation], that should be soon transformated into a regular curricular study programm with a university degree [in ein Regelstudium überführt].

Unit for Peace Studies Alumni Network 
Established in 2008, a vast amount of alumni initiatives have emerged within the active network of graduates from the MA Program in Peace and Conflict Studies.

Many Peaces Magazine
The Many Peaces Magazine was conceptualized and launched in 2014 by Adham Hamed, Mayme Lefurgey, Paul Lauer and Isabelle Guibert. It was created as an outlet to showcase the work of alumni, students, cooperation partners and friends of the Master of Arts Program in Peace, Development, Security and International Conflict Transformation and the UNESCO Chair for Peace Studies located at Universität Innsbruck, Austria. The magazine is published twice a year, in January and July of each year. The Many Peaces Magazine team has changed and developed over the past volumes and is currently coordinated by a team spread out over three continents and features authors and stories from around the globe. Many of the articles, stories and contributions that can be found in the magazine relate to the field of Peace Studies in some way, but more specifically to the fields of Transrational Peace Philosophy and Elicitive Conflict Transformation.

Peace Studies Fund e.V. 
An alumni run initiative raising funds for scholarships for peace and conflict studies scholars from the Global South.
For more information please visit their website: www.peacestudiesfund.org

Many Peaces e.V.
An alumni run initiative organizing workshops on applied methods of elicitive conflict transformation, as developed at the Innsbruck School of Peace Studies.

References

Sources 

University of Innsbruck
Peace organisations based in Austria